John T and Mary Turner House is a historic home located at Raleigh, Wake County, North Carolina.  It was built about 1889, and is a two-story, side gable I-house with one-story sections at its rear.  It incorporates Queen Anne and Colonial Revival-style design elements.  It was constructed by John T. Turner, an African-American entrepreneur.

It was listed on the National Register of Historic Places in 2002.

References

African-American history in Raleigh, North Carolina
Houses on the National Register of Historic Places in North Carolina
Queen Anne architecture in North Carolina
Colonial Revival architecture in North Carolina
Houses completed in 1889
Houses in Raleigh, North Carolina
National Register of Historic Places in Raleigh, North Carolina